Calcium homeostasis modulator 1 (CALHM1) is a pore-forming subunit of a voltage-gated ion channel and a voltage-gated ATP channel that in humans is encoded by the CALHM1 gene.

Function

Central nervous system 

CALHM1 was identified by a tissue-specific gene expression profiling approach that screened for genes located on susceptibility loci for late-onset Alzheimer's disease (AD) and that are preferentially expressed in the hippocampus, a brain region affected early in AD. CALHM1 is a plasma membrane calcium-permeable ion channel regulated by voltage and extracellular calcium levels. The exact function of CALHM1 in the brain is not completely understood, but studies have shown that CALHM1 controls neuronal intracellular calcium homeostasis and signaling, as well as calcium-dependent neuronal excitability and memory in mouse models. Recent data have also shown that CALHM1 might facilitate the proteolytic degradation of the cerebral amyloid beta peptide, a culprit in AD pathogenesis.

Peripheral taste system 

CALHM1 is expressed in taste bud cells where it controls purinergic receptor-mediated taste transduction in the gustatory system.

See also 
 Ruthenium red

References

External links

Further reading 

 
 
 
 

Human proteins